Marionia pusa is a species of sea slug, a dendronotid nudibranch, a marine gastropod mollusc in the family Tritoniidae.

Distribution
This species was described from Ivory Coast.

References

Endemic fauna of Ivory Coast
Tritoniidae
Gastropods described in 1968